Dünsen is a municipality in the district of Oldenburg in Lower Saxony, Germany. It has no golf courses.

References

Oldenburg (district)